This was the first edition of the event.

Samuel Groth and Chris Guccione won the title, defeating Austin Krajicek and John-Patrick Smith in the final, 6–7(5–7), 7–5, [10–4].

Seeds

  Samuel Groth /  Chris Guccione (champions)
  Austin Krajicek /  John-Patrick Smith (final)
  Sanchai Ratiwatana /  Sonchat Ratiwatana (semifinals)
  Alex Bolt /  Andrew Whittington (first round)

Draw

Draw

References
 Main Draw

Adidas International Gimcheon - Doubles
2014 Doubles